The county lists for the Norwegian parliamentary election, 2001 was a group of nine political lists, or parties, which under different names ran for the 2001 parliamentary election in Norway. Common for all the parties, was that all of them were made up of people who had been excluded or voluntarily left the Progress Party after the turmoil that erupted in the party around 2000/2001.

The most noticeable of them were Member of Parliament Vidar Kleppe, who was the top candidate of the Southern Norway List in Vest-Agder, as well as being present on the lists of the Hedmark List and the Hordaland List. Kleppe was noticeably also joined by Elvis impersonator Kjell Elvis, and IK Start football legend Karsten Johannessen in Vest-Agder. Other Progress Party MPs on the county lists were Dag Danielsen and Fridtjof Frank Gundersen, the first and second candidates for the Oslo List, and Jørn Stang who was the top candidate of the Østfold List.

The lists did not campaign as a common party, and even though they had much in common they were formally separate entities. The most successful of the lists was the Southern Norway List of Vidar Kleppe, but neither he managed to secure a renewed place in the Norwegian parliament.

Results for the lists in their respective counties:

Together, the lists received 4.026 votes, accounting for 0,16% of the votes nationwide.

In 2002, the party the Democrats were founded with Vidar Kleppe as the chairman. Many of the members of the county lists joined the new party, though not all. The top candidate for the Troms List, Karl-Olav Slorafoss, was for instance later active in the Coastal Party.

References

Defunct political parties in Norway
Political parties established in 2001